Ian Alec Harvey Dench (born 7 August 1964) is an English songwriter and musician. He was the guitarist and principal songwriter for EMF, who scored a major international hit reaching number 1 in the United States with "Unbelievable" in 1991. It was voted one of BBC Radio 2's 'Greatest Guitar Riffs'.

Early life
Ian Alec Harvey Dench was born in Cheltenham. 
Dench’s father, Harold Dench, taught Ian classical guitar.
Ian attended The Crypt School in Gloucester from 1975, where one year at Prizegiving, his chosen prize of "100 Greatest Rock Licks" was somewhat frowned upon, compared to the preferred academic tomes of others.
Ian began his music career playing in a Gloucester City punk band called Curse. He then formed the Gloucester-based band Apple Mosaic who were signed to Virgin Records and released the single "Honey If".

EMF
In 1989, Dench met the other members of EMF, and within a few months of playing together, they were signed to a major label. Their debut hit, Unbelievable, was written by Dench although credited as EMF, and reached number three in the UK chart. Six months later, the song reached #1 in America.

In an interview with Spin in September 1991, Dench commented on the dynamics within the band, stating that: "I'm the musical director, but I couldn't do it without them. They provide so much attitude. 

The band split in 1997 due to musical differences.

Post EMF and songwriting career

After leaving EMF, he found independent success with the band Whistler, signed to Wiiija Records. Whistler released two albums, Whistler and Faith in the Morning. 

In 2007, Dench wrote the duet Beautiful Liar for Beyoncé and Shakira, and "Tattoo" for American Idol winner Jordin Sparks with Amanda Ghost with whom he had worked since 1995 when they wrote for Ghost's Ghost Stories album. Beyoncé's 2008 album I Am Sasha Fierce saw a further three Dench and Ghost collaborations: Disappear, Ave Maria, and Satellites.

Dench co-wrote Colours on the Prodigy's 2009 album, Invaders Must Die, and "Red" a top 5 hit for Daniel Merriweather in the UK in May 2009. Gypsy, another collaboration with Amanda Ghost, was the third single from the album, She Wolf by Shakira.

From March 2009 until November 2010, Dench was Vice President of A&R at Epic Records in New York, where he A&R'd albums by Alice Smith and Augustana and signed the acts Progress in Color and HeyHiHello.

In 2011, Dench collaborated in the writing of Bedroom Hymns from Florence and the Machine's Ceremonials album, and her collaboration with ASAP Rocky, I Come Apart.

In 2013, Dench collaborated on the Sub Focus track Endorphins, reaching No 10 in the UK charts, The Conversation by Texas and Astronaut and Run by Joel Compass.

The singer-songwriter Jamie Cullum sang two Dench-penned songs in the ITV series The Halcyon in 2016.

In 2017 it was announced that Dench was heading up a new record label, LGM Records, with former Goldheart Assembly frontman James Dale, where the two developed and signed indie pop band Friedberg. The label was featured in The Times and other publications before founding a digital advertising agency called SINE Digital.  

In 2018 Dench worked with Amanda Ghost and Marius DeVries on the song 'The Wonder' for the musical King Kong on Broadway.

Awards

Dench won an Ivor Novello Award for Beautiful Liar in the Best Selling British Song Category in 2008. In 2009, he was nominated for a Golden Globe as co-writer of Once in a Lifetime, sung by Beyonce for the film, Cadillac Records. He was nominated for two Grammy Awards in 2010, one as co-producer of two tracks on Beyoncé's album I Am... Sasha Fierce, which was nominated as Album of the Year and the other for Once in a Lifetime.

References

1966 births
Living people
English songwriters
English rock guitarists
Ivor Novello Award winners
People from Cheltenham
Alumni of the Ruskin School of Art
Musicians from Gloucestershire